Shahin Naghipour Jafari (Persian: شاهین نقی پور جعفری, born December 3, 1993)  is a karate competitor for the Iran national team.

Honors 
 Gold medal at the 2013 Malesia International karate tournament  
 South Korean Adult Karate League Gold Medal 2012
 Won the 2011 Malaysia World Championship bronze medal
 Won the silver medal at the 2009 Morocco World Championship
 Won the 2010 Asian Gold Medal in Hong Kong
 Won the 2010 World Cup Gold Medal
 Won the 2011 World Cup Gold Medal
 Gold medal at the 2010 Russian World Championships
 Gold medal at the 2007 sweden International karate tournament

References 

Living people
1993 births
Iranian male karateka
Sportspeople from Tehran
21st-century Iranian people